Chí Hòa Prison ( or ) is a functioning Vietnamese prison located in Ho Chi Minh City, Vietnam. The prison is an octagonal building on a 7-hectare site consisting of detention rooms, jail cells, prison walls, watchtowers, facilities and prisoner's farmlands. The prison is one of 12 national prisons in Vietnam. Originally built by the French Indochina colonial government in 1943 (or 1939) to replace the Saigon Grand Prison, the prison was extensively used by all succeeding governments of Vietnam. Due to its complex and effective architecture, the prison is considered one of the highest security prisons in Vietnam as there were only two successful prison breaks in its history.

History 
In 1930s, the 1890 French-built Saigon Grand Prison became overcrowded because of the increasing number of prisoners at that time. This situation prompted the French Indochina government to build a new and larger prison to replace the Saigon Grand Prison. In 1939 (or 1943, depending on various sources), the government began the construction of Chi Hoa prison by hiring French contractors and using the design of local Vietnamese architects. In 1945, the construction was interrupted by the Empire of Japan overthrowing of the French. After the return of the French in 1950, the construction was resumed and the building process was completely finished in 1953.

After the completion of Chí Hòa prison, Emperor Bảo Đại decided to permanently shut down the Saigon Grand Prison and transferred all prisoners to the new prison. From this point on, the government of the State of Vietnam (later Republic of Vietnam) used the prison extensively.

After the fall of Saigon in 1975, the new government of the Socialist Republic of Vietnam has continued to use this prison until the present day. In 2010, the  Ho Chi Minh city government announced a plan to demolish the prison and build a new corporative housing over the prison's land.

Architecture 

The prison's main structure is a three-floor octagonal building, heavily influenced by the I Ching's eight trigrams theory. The whole building is actually formed by seven tile-roofed building lines and one flat-roofed north-facing building line which are named in turn following these names of I Ching's eight trigrams. The exterior side and the interior side were built differently. The exterior side is closed by air-holed brick walls and the interior side is opened by a roofless green space from which the prisoners are separated by iron pales. Later, eight building lines are divided as areas which named alphabetically as A area, B area, C area, D area, E area, F area, G area, and H area. These areas are combined into 6 zones which are named as AB zone, BC zone, ED zone, FG zone, AH zone, and ID zone. The zones contain 238 cells:
 The AB zone: 52 cells
 The ID zone: 17 cells
 The security zone (solitary confinement zone): 3 cells
 The D zone: 65 narrow cells
 The remaining zones: 101 cells.

In the center of the prison there is a tall and large water tower that doubles as the main watchtower, allowing the prison guards a clear view of all the prison cells. Apart from prison cells, the main building also has the facilities for prisoners, prison managers and guards.

Later, a Christian chapel and a Buddhist temple was built in the land surrounding the main building but they are all destroyed now. There also are small farmland lots and facilities such as a restaurant and toilets for prisoners in this land. The outermost part of the prison is separated from the populous residential areas by a squared brick wall plus barbed-wire fence. There are four watchtowers in the four corners of the walls.

Prison operation 
The prison has been infamous for its harsh and squalid conditions for a very long time, regardless of its operators. In the time of the French colonial government, the prisoners were confined in the light-lacking cells and were usually fettered.

In the time of South Vietnam, the prison usually held from 6,000 to 8,000 prisoners or even 10,000 prisoners. These prisoners were divided into two groups by their convicted crimes: the first group were prisoners who were convicted of politically related crimes and the second group were prisoners who were convicted of other crimes. The males and females were confined in different cells and the prisoners could only leave their cells briefly to satisfy their needs for food and hygiene. There was always one battalion of police guarding the prison. In spite of being only a prison, two executions were carried out in Chí Hòa prison: the execution of Ngô Đình Cẩn and the execution of Nguyễn Văn Trỗi.

After the fall of Saigon, the prison was kept running by the new Socialist Republic of Vietnam government but there is only little information in regards to the way it was being operated. There is some brief information in The Black Book of Communism which describes the conditions of the prison as extremely bad.

The prison is also infamous for its high security. It is considered to be a prison from which the prisoners can never break out of. However, there have been two successful prison breaks in the past: the first one occurred in 1945 when the Viet Minh took the advantage of the defeat of Japan in World War II to attack and free its members who were jailed in an incomplete and ill-guarded Chi Hoa prison. And the second one was the prison break of the infamous Vietnamese robber Phuoc Tam Ngon (Phuoc the eight-finger) in 1995 when he managed to break his fetters and evade the security forces in a prison break which Vietnamese police described as "an unbelievable prison break".

Notable prisoners

Pre-1975
Because of its security, many politicians and military personnel were jailed in this prison. The following is a partial list of some recorded famous people who have been jailed in Chi Hoa Prison:
 Lam Sơn, ROV general
 Ngô Đình Cẩn, politician
 Nguyễn Tường Tam, writer
 Nguyễn Văn Trỗi, NLF member
 Phan Khắc Sửu, politician
 Trần Ngọc Châu, politician
 Trương Đình Dzũ, politician
 Võ Thị Sáu, Martyrdom
 Vũ Hồng Khanh, politician
 Vũ Vũ Gia, ROV general

Post-1975
After the end of Vietnam War, the new government kept operating the prison. Many famous people have been jailed here. Here is an incomplete list of these people
 Phuoc Tam Ngon, famous Vietnamese robber
 Phan Huy Quát, ROV politician

See also
Côn Đảo Prison

References

Prisoner-of-war camps
Vietnam War sites
Vietnam War prisoner of war camps
Torture in Vietnam
Buildings and structures in Ho Chi Minh City
Prisons in Vietnam